Egesina minuta is a species of beetle in the family Cerambycidae. It was described by Warren Samuel Fisher in 1925.

References

Egesina
Beetles described in 1925